Spring Valley may refer to:
Spring Valley, Frederick County, Virginia
Spring Valley, Grayson County, Virginia
Spring Valley, Roanoke County, Virginia
Spring Valley, Stafford County, Virginia